Aniseed Valley is a locality running between the Tasman district and Marlborough Region in the South Island of New Zealand. It is located around the Roding River southeast of Hope.

Copper was discovered in the upper valley in 1881, and several mines, smelters and tramways were developed in the 1880s, but closed down due to low copper prices. An attempt to reopen the mines in the early 20th century failed after a few years. There are walking tracks which allow visitors to view the ruins and mining sites.

The Hackett carpark on Aniseed Valley Road gives access to a track, part of Te Araroa, along Hackett Creek to the Whispering Falls in the Mount Richmond Forest Park.

Demographics

Aniseed Valley had a population of 492 at the 2018 New Zealand census, an increase of 96 people (24.2%) since the 2013 census, and an increase of 147 people (42.6%) since the 2006 census. There were 144 households. There were 258 males and 234 females, giving a sex ratio of 1.1 males per female. The median age was 40.2 years (compared with 37.4 years nationally), with 120 people (24.4%) aged under 15 years, 78 (15.9%) aged 15 to 29, 231 (47.0%) aged 30 to 64, and 63 (12.8%) aged 65 or older.

Ethnicities were 93.9% European/Pākehā, 6.1% Māori, 1.2% Pacific peoples, 3.0% Asian, and 3.7% other ethnicities (totals add to more than 100% since people could identify with multiple ethnicities).

The proportion of people born overseas was 18.9%, compared with 27.1% nationally.

Although some people objected to giving their religion, 54.9% had no religion, 37.2% were Christian, 0.6% were Buddhist and 1.8% had other religions.

Of those at least 15 years old, 111 (29.8%) people had a bachelor or higher degree, and 36 (9.7%) people had no formal qualifications. The median income was $38,600, compared with $31,800 nationally. The employment status of those at least 15 was that 204 (54.8%) people were employed full-time, 87 (23.4%) were part-time, and 3 (0.8%) were unemployed.

References

Populated places in the Tasman District
Landforms of the Tasman District
Valleys of New Zealand